The NCHC Scholar-Athlete of the Year is an annual award given out at the conclusion of the National Collegiate Hockey Conference regular season to the best defensive forward in the conference. Each team selects a player from their own roster to be on the conference Scholar-Athlete Team. The coaches of each NCHC team then vote to determine the Scholar-Athlete of the Year.

The Scholar-Athlete of the Year was first awarded in 2014 and is a successor to the CCHA Scholar-Athlete of the Year which was discontinued after the conference dissolved due to the 2013–14 NCAA conference realignment.

Award winners

Winners by school

Winners by position

See also
NCHC Awards
CCHA Scholar-Athlete of the Year

References

External links

National Collegiate Hockey Conference
College ice hockey trophies and awards in the United States
NCHC
Awards established in 2014